This article shows the rosters of all participating teams at the 2017 FIVB Men's World Champions Cup in Osaka and Nagoya, Japan.

The following is the Brazilian roster in the 2017 FIVB Men's World Champions Cup.

Head coach: Renan Dal Zotto

The following is the French roster in the 2017 FIVB Men's World Champions Cup.

Head coach: Laurent Tillie

The following is the Iranian roster in the 2017 FIVB Men's World Champions Cup.

Head coach:  Igor Kolaković

The following is the Italian roster in the 2017 FIVB Men's World Champions Cup.

Head coach: Gianlorenzo Blengini

The following is the Japanese roster in the 2017 FIVB Men's World Champions Cup.

Head coach: Yuichi Nakagaichi

The following is the American roster in the 2017 FIVB Men's World Champions Cup.

Head coach: John Speraw

See also
2017 FIVB Volleyball Women's World Grand Champions Cup squads

References

External links

FIVB Volleyball
International volleyball competitions hosted by Japan
September 2017 sports events in Asia